Dedë Gjon Luli Dedvukaj also referred to as Ded Gjo Luli and Deda (November 1840–24 September 1915) was an Albanian guerrilla leader most notable for commanding the 1911 revolt against Ottoman troops. He was posthumously awarded the "Hero of Albania" title. Dedvukaj was the clan chieftain of the Hoti tribe.

Early life
Dedvukaj was born in the village of Traboin, at the time part of the Sanjak of Scutari of the Ottoman Empire (now in Podgorica, Montenegro). He belonged to the Dedvukaj family (or brotherhood) of the Hoti tribe. In the late Ottoman period, Hoti was regarded the foremost bajrak of the Malësia e Madhe region.  Dedvukaj adhered to Roman Catholicism.

League of Prizren
A member of the League of Prizren, Ded Gjoni participated in the conflicts in Plav and Gusinje (1879–80) that resisted the decision of the Congress of Berlin (June–July 1878) to cede Ottoman territories to the Principality of Montenegro (as part of ending the Great Eastern Crisis). As the cession of Plav and Gusinje was proven impossible without bloodbath, the Ottoman Empire ceded Ulqin in January 1880 as compensation.

Albanian rebellions

During the Albanian revolt of 1910 and amidst the campaign by Ottoman forces to restore order in the Malësia highlands, Dedvukaj and his tribe Hoti along with the highlanders of Shalë defied the vali of Shkodër and refused to pay taxes or give up their arms.

By the beginning of 1911, Roman Catholic Albanians were disturbed by the Ottoman situation in the Balkans. Montenegrin king Nikola Petrović encouraged the northern Albanian tribes (Malissori) to revolt against the Ottoman Empire. In the highlands north of Shkodër an uprising broke out by March 1911 and Luli along with his men attacked Ottoman watch-posts on the Ottoman-Montenegrin border. After having led a premature rebellion in the mountains north of Scutari in late March 1911, succeeding in capturing Tuzi, Dedvukaj was compelled by King Nikola to rally the Malissori in April. Albanian rebels and refugees from the Kosovo Vilayet had been given refuge in Montenegro. General Vukotić himself passed out weapons to them, despite the fact that Montenegro was officially neutral. Rebels were returned across the frontier, and some 8,000 men, with Montenegrin supply of arms, ammunition and advice, fought against Ottoman divisions, defeating the large contingent of Shefket Turgut Pasha several times. After the victory at Deçiq, an Albanian flag was symbolically raised on the Bratile mountain for the first time in several centuries since Ottoman occupation. Despite aiding the rebels, Nikola's strategy was to spark unrest in northern Albania and north-western Kosovo so that he could intervene and expand his borders.

Legacy

Dedë Gjon Luli is most known for starting the revolution for the Albanians, which eventually led to later actions by Luigj Gurakuqi, Ismail Qemali, and Isa Boletini. In Tirana, Albania's capital city, there is a street named in his honor called "Rruga Ded Gjo Luli". In the village of Bardhaj in Hot, the rubble of his house, that was left in ruins after the war, was converted into a museum which represents his life as a hero to the Albanian people.

An epic poem on his 1910–11 fight against the Ottomans was written by Gjergj Fishta.

Death 
In September 1915, Dedë Gjon Luli, roughly 75 years old, was walking along a road in Orosh, Miredite, when he was ambushed by Montenegrin forces.

References

Further reading
 
 
 
 

1840 births
1915 deaths
Albanian Roman Catholics
Heroes of Albania
Activists of the Albanian National Awakening
19th-century Albanian military personnel
20th-century Albanian military personnel
People from Scutari vilayet
Malsorë
Albanians from the Ottoman Empire
Albanian rebels